Patrick Collins is a former running back in the National Football League (NFL).

Biography
Collins was born Patrick Norman Collins on August 4, 1966 in Okmulgee, Oklahoma.

Career
Collins was drafted by the Green Bay Packers in the eighth round of the 1988 NFL Draft and played that season with the team. He played at the collegiate level at the University of Oklahoma.

See also
List of Green Bay Packers players

References

1966 births
Living people
People from Okmulgee, Oklahoma
Green Bay Packers players
American football running backs
University of Oklahoma alumni
Oklahoma Sooners football players
Players of American football from Oklahoma